Shahier Razik (born November 18, 1977, in Cairo, Egypt) is a professional squash player who represented Canada. He reached a career-high world ranking of World No. 20 in June 2008.

References

External links 
 
 
 
 

1977 births
Living people
Canadian male squash players
Pan American Games medalists in squash
Pan American Games gold medalists for Canada
Pan American Games silver medalists for Canada
Squash players at the 2003 Pan American Games
Squash players at the 2007 Pan American Games
Squash players at the 2011 Pan American Games
Medalists at the 2011 Pan American Games
Commonwealth Games competitors for Canada
Squash players at the 2006 Commonwealth Games
Squash players at the 2010 Commonwealth Games
Sportspeople from Cairo
Sportspeople from Toronto
21st-century Canadian people